Nahri is a village in Sonipat district of Haryana, India.

References 

Villages in Sonipat district